Maulvi Ghulam Rasool Alamapuri (29 January 1849 – 7 March 1892) was a popular saint and Sufi poet and author of Punjabi and Urdu languages.

Life
Maulvi was born in Alam Pur village, District Hoshiarpur ( Punjab, British India). His father's name was Murad Bakhsh. He was only six months old when his mother died and was only 12 years old when his father died.

He received primary education from Maulvi Hamid Sahib of his village.

He worked as a school teacher in Meerpur (a village in present-day Haryana), from 1864 to 1878. His formal teaching profession ended in 1882 at his resignation from his last school in Mahesar. He was the teacher of the mother of another Sufi sage, Hussain Bakhsh alias Baba Malang Sahib, from Hoshiarpur. Hussain was the descendant of Yaar Muhammad, one of the generals of South Indian ruler Tipu Sultan.

One PhD in Patiala, India, and two PhDs in Punjab, Pakistan, have been awarded on his life and works.

At his 119th death anniversary, seminars were organized in Punjab of both Pakistan and India. In Pakistan, a seminar organized by Pakistan Academy of Letters (PAL), a book written on him by his grandson Masud Ahmed was inaugurated.

In 2014, his shrine got media attention in India when the owner of the land, who had taken the adjoining land on lease from the Waqf Board, refused to allow passage to Maulvi’s grandson who had come from Pakistan to visit the grave of his grandfather

Works
Dastan-e-Ameer Hamza (1864)
Ahasana-ul-kasasa (Qissa Yousaf Zulaikha)
Sassi Punnu
Bandanama
Chaupatnama
Roohul Tarteel
Chittian (Letters)

References

People from Hoshiarpur district
Punjabi Sufi saints
1849 births
1892 deaths